Jakub Štěpánek (born 20 June 1986 in Vsetín, Moravia, Czechoslovakia) is a Czech professional ice hockey goaltender currently playing for Brûleurs de Loups  of the French Synerglace Ligue Magnus.

Playing career
Štěpánek began his professional career with HC Vítkovice of the Czech Extraliga in 2006. He was selected to play for the Czech national team at the 2010 Winter Olympics along with goaltenders Ondřej Pavelec and Tomáš Vokoun, both of whom play in the National Hockey League. He has also represented his country at two IIHF World Championships, helping the Czechs win gold at the 2010 tournament in Germany.

Štěpánek helped St. Petersburg win their fourth Spengler Cup in 2010, their first title since 1977. He won the National League A title with SC Bern in 2016.

Career statistics

Regular season and playoffs

References

External links 
 

1986 births
Living people
SC Bern players
Czech ice hockey goaltenders
HC Dynamo Pardubice players
HC Lev Praha players
Lukko players
Severstal Cherepovets players
SKA Saint Petersburg players
HC Slovan Bratislava players
HC Vítkovice players
People from Vsetín
Sportspeople from the Zlín Region
Czech expatriate ice hockey players in Russia
Czech expatriate ice hockey players in Switzerland
Czech expatriate ice hockey players in Finland
Czech expatriate sportspeople in France
Expatriate ice hockey players in France